Megachile jerryrozeni is a species of bee in the family Megachilidae. It was described by Genaro in 2003.

References

Jerryrozeni
Insects described in 2003